The City Bank of Montreal (known in French as "La Banque de la Cité") was an early bank founded in Montreal in 1833, when it was part of Lower Canada. It was founded as a counterpart to the Bank of Montreal, whose politically conservative directors made it difficult for leading liberals to do business in the province. During its existence, it issued a number of tokens for use in trade, and is known for producing many varieties of the Bouquet sou, and for co-issuing the Habitant token along with the other leading banks of Montreal in the late 1830s. It also issued paper money.

It also had branches in Toronto, and in Quebec City.

City Bank merged with Royal Canadian Bank to form Consolidated Bank of Canada in 1876.

Bibliography

References

Defunct banks of Canada
Banks disestablished in 1876
Banks established in 1849
1876 disestablishments in Canada
Canadian companies established in 1849